Sultan Hatun may refer to:

 Sultan Hatun (wife of Bayezid I)
 Sultan Hatun (wife of Murad II)